The 2006 Eastern Illinois Panthers football team represented  Eastern Illinois University as a member of the Ohio Valley Conference (OVC) during the 2006 NCAA Division I FCS football season. The team was led by interim head coach Mark Hutson, as head coach Bob Spoo was unable to coach for medical reasons, and played their home games at O'Brien Field in Charleston, Illinois. The team received an at-large bid to the NCAA Division I Football Championship playoffs, where they lost to Illinois State in the first round. Eastern Illinois was ranked No. 15 in The Sports Network's postseason ranking of NCAA Division I FCS teams.

Schedule

References

Eastern Illinois
Eastern Illinois Panthers football seasons
Ohio Valley Conference football champion seasons
Eastern Illinois Panthers football